The first inauguration of Lyndon B. Johnson as the 36th president of the United States was held on Friday, November 22, 1963, aboard Air Force One at Dallas Love Field, following the assassination of President John F. Kennedy earlier that day. The inauguration – the eighth non-scheduled, extraordinary inauguration to ever take place – marked the commencement of the first term (a partial term of ) of Lyndon B. Johnson as president.

Assassination of John F. Kennedy

At 12:30 pm Central Standard Time on November 22, Kennedy was shot in Dallas while riding with his wife, Jacqueline, in the presidential motorcade. Vice President Johnson was riding in a car behind the president with his wife, Lady Bird Johnson, and Texas Senator Ralph Yarborough. Immediately after shots were fired, Johnson was thrown down and sat on by Secret Service agent Rufus Youngblood, and the President's and Vice President's cars sped to Parkland Memorial Hospital.

There were initial reports that Johnson might have also been shot, slightly wounded in the arm or that he had suffered another heart attack (he had suffered one eight years earlier that nearly killed him). Mrs. Johnson confirmed to reporters that he was fine and did not suffer any injury or illness other than being shaken at what he had seen.

In the hospital, Johnson was surrounded by Secret Service agents, who encouraged him to return to Washington in case he too was targeted for assassination. Johnson wished to wait until he knew of Kennedy's condition; at 1:20 pm, he was told Kennedy was dead and left the hospital almost 20 minutes later.

Dallas Love Field

At this point arrangements were made to provide Secret Service protection of the two Johnson daughters (Lynda Bird Johnson Robb and Luci Baines Johnson), and it was decided that the new president would leave on the presidential aircraft because it had better communications equipment. Johnson was driven by an unmarked police car to Dallas Love Field, and kept below the car's window level throughout the journey.

The president waited for Jacqueline Kennedy, who in turn would not leave Dallas without her husband's body, to arrive aboard Air Force One. Kennedy's casket was finally brought to the aircraft, but takeoff was delayed until Johnson took the oath of office.

There was concern that since the Secret Service had taken the body of Kennedy from Parkland Hospital against the wishes of the Dallas medical examiner, Earl Rose, who had insisted an autopsy was required, the Dallas Police Department would seek to prevent Air Force One taking off.

President Johnson chose federal district Judge Sarah T. Hughes, a long-standing friend, to swear him in.

Inauguration aboard Air Force One
For the inauguration twenty-seven people squeezed into the 12-by-15-foot stateroom of Air Force One for the proceedings. Adding to the discomfort was the lack of air conditioning as the aircraft had been disconnected from the external power supply, in order to take off promptly. As the inauguration proceeded the four jet engines of Air Force One were being powered up.

The Warren Commission's report detailed the inauguration:

The swearing-in ceremony administered by Judge Hughes in an Air Force One conference room represented the first and so far only time that a woman administered the presidential oath of office as well as the only time it was conducted on an airplane. Instead of the usual Bible, Johnson was sworn in upon a missal found on a side table in Kennedy's Air Force One bedroom. After the oath had been taken, Johnson kissed his wife on the forehead. Mrs. Johnson then took Jackie Kennedy's hand and told her, "The whole nation mourns your husband."

At almost exactly the same time as the ceremony, CBS anchor Walter Cronkite read aloud on the air wire copy from the Associated Press officially confirming Kennedy's death, subsequently adding that Johnson would "presumably" be sworn in as president. Although he had spent the previous hour relaying unofficial reports that Kennedy had died, Cronkite was visibly shocked by the official confirmation. After announcing Kennedy's death, the veteran anchor mistakenly referred to Johnson as the "Vice President" and inaccurately implied that he needed to take the oath of office in order to "become the 36th President of the United States". In fact, Johnson immediately became president upon Kennedy's death and only needed to take the oath to exercise the powers and duties of his new office. According to the Museum of Broadcast Communications's Encyclopedia of Television, during their frantic afternoon coverage of the unfolding events, Cronkite and other American broadcasters made a "determined effort" to refer to him as "President Johnson".

The famous photograph of the inauguration was taken by Cecil Stoughton, John F. Kennedy's official photographer. On Stoughton's suggestion Johnson was flanked by his wife and Jacqueline Kennedy, facing slightly away from the camera so that blood stains on her pink Chanel suit would not be visible. The photograph was taken using a Hasselblad camera. The inauguration was sound recorded by White House Press Secretary Malcolm Kilduff using Air Force One's Dictaphone.

Aftermath

During the flight back to Andrews Air Force Base, Johnson made several phone calls on the radio telephone, including to Rose Kennedy (JFK's mother) and Nellie Connally (wife of John Connally). In addition, he made the decision to request all cabinet members to stay in their posts and asked to meet both parties' leaders in Congress soon.

Johnson also asked Jack Valenti, Bill Moyers, and Liz Carpenter to write a brief statement for him to read on the day's events, which he then edited slightly himself. At 6:10 pm, after landing at Andrews amid a crowd of congressional leaders, he walked to an already prepared set of microphones and began his first public statement as president: 

Johnson had to raise his voice to be heard at the Air Force base, and afterward regretted delivering the remarks, believing he sounded harsh and strident.

See also
Presidency of Lyndon B. Johnson
Let Us Continue
Second inauguration of Lyndon B. Johnson

References

External links

President Johnson's remarks at Andrews Air Force Base following assassination of President Kennedy, November 22, 1963, from the Lyndon Baines Johnson Library and Museum
Johnson's Daily Diary for November 22, 1963 from the Johnson Library and Museum
More photos of the taking of the oath, from the John F. Kennedy Presidential Library and Museum
More material relating to succession  from the Johnson Library and Museum

Johnson, Lyndon B
1963 in American politics
Inauguration 1963
Assassination of John F. Kennedy
History of Dallas
1963 in Texas
November 1963 events in the United States
1960s in Dallas